Makhunik (also Romanized as Mākhūnīk, Māh-i-Khūnik, Māh Khūnīk, and Makhoonik; also known as Māh-i-Khūpik, Mak-i-Khūnik, and Moḩammadkhānak) is a village in Doreh Rural District, in the Central District of Sarbisheh County, South Khorasan Province, Iran. At the 2006 census, its population was 582, in 125 families. In ancient times this area is famous for short heights or dwarf living here.

References 
</ref>

Populated places in Sarbisheh County